Adam Agius (born 21 September 1971) is the vocalist, guitarist, keyboardist and a founding member of the progressive metal band Alchemist. He formed Alchemist in 1987 while still in high school and is the group's only remaining original member. He also was the financial provider, director of show day and promoter for Metal for the Brain. His main band Alchemist went on an indefinite hiatus and as a result has started up a new successor project The Levitation Hex. The Levitation Hex also includes Mark Palfreyman and Scott Young of Alarum and Ben Hocking of Aeon of Horus. A tentative album is due for May 2012 with a tour later on to promote the album. He has a side project Pilots of Baalbek.

Vocal style and musical influences

Vocal style
Agius' vocal style is one of the most prominent aspects of Alchemist's music. His voice ranges from a standard death growl-like approach to extraordinary high-pitched screams and shrieks he refers to as "banshee screams", best exemplified by the tracks "Chinese Whispers" and "Garden of Eroticism". Later recordings have seen him employ a deep tribal-like chant and half-spoken singing along with a more clean vocal style. As a vocalist he is completely self-taught but as a guitarist and keyboardist, he had some basic training as a teen. In the liner notes to the Embryonics album, he claims he lost his voice during the recording of the first Alchemist album Jar of Kingdom.

Musical influences
Agius' musical influences are a diverse mix of grindcore, thrash metal, punk rock and progressive rock, among which he lists artists including; Pink Floyd, Slayer, Napalm Death, King Crimson, Exodus, New York Dolls and Celtic Frost. Outside of Alchemist, he has a solo project called GrindPony.  He has also made a successor band to Alchemist called The Levitation Hex.

Agius' favorite musicians are Tom Araya (vocalist), David Gilmour/Scott Hull (guitarists), Steve Digiorgio (bassist), Paul Bostaph (drummer), and all musicians in the deathgrind band Pig Destroyer.

Equipment
 Jackson seven-string guitar
 ESP seven-string guitar
 Mesa Boogie 4x12 cabinet
 Mesa Boogie Dual rectifier solo head
 Boss giga delay
 Boss ge 7 EQ
 Line 6 POD version2
 Gibson Les Paul custom plus 1988
 Electro Harmonix memory man Deluxe.
 Korg – microkorg synthesizer
 Yamaha EX5 synthesizer

Discography

With Alchemist

The Levitation Hex
 The Levitation Hex (2012)
 Cohesion (2016)

Pilots of Baalbek

Uncontrolled Airspace (2020)

References

External links
 Alchemist official site
 Alchemist official MySpace
 Agius' personal bio on the official Alchemist site

1971 births
Living people
Australian heavy metal guitarists
Australian heavy metal singers
21st-century Australian male singers
Australian people of Maltese descent
People from Canberra
21st-century guitarists
Australian male guitarists